The 1930 Montana Grizzlies football team represented the University of Montana in the 1930 college football season as a member of the Pacific Coast Conference (PCC). The Grizzlies were led by fifth-year head coach Frank W. Milburn, played their home games at Dornblaser Field and finished the season with a record of five wins and three losses (5–3, 1–3 PCC).

Schedule

References

Montana
Montana Grizzlies football seasons
Montana Grizzlies football